Another Love Song is the first studio album released by Irish rock band The Frames. First released in 1991 on Island Records, the album went out of print a few years after its original release and has become somewhat of a collector's item among fans. It spawned the singles "The Dancer" and "Masquerade", the former being used as the soundtrack to Match Of The Day's 'Goal of the Week' segment in the early 1990s.

The album was remastered in 2010, and re-released on 5 July with 8 bonus tracks. The re-released version is re-packaged in a slipcase with a 12-page booklet, complete with photos and song lyrics.  The album is also still available for download on The Frames' official website and on some international iTunes Stores.

Track listing
 "The Dancer"
 "You Were Wrong"
 "Right Road (Wrong Road)"
 "Before You Go"
 "The Waltz"
 "Downhill From Here"
 "Masquerade"
 "Picture of Love"
 "Martha"
 "Another Love Song"
 "Telegraph Poles"
 "Live Forever"

Bonus tracks (Re-release only)
 "Last Song To You"
 "Stamp My Name"
 "Teardrops In My Wine"
 "Nixxi Focal"
 "Before You Go" (full version)
 "The Dancer" (acoustic version)
 "Life’s a Gas"
 "Shake You"

References

External links
The Frames: Another Love Song
Irish Music Central: Lyrics: The Frames: Another Love Song

1991 debut albums
The Frames albums
Albums produced by Gil Norton
Island Records albums